The Brabham BT56 was a Formula One car designed by John Baldwin and Sergio Rinland and raced by the Brabham team in the 1987 Formula One season. It was driven by Andrea de Cesaris, Riccardo Patrese and Stefano Modena; both de Cesaris and Patrese scored a 3rd place driving the BT56.

Design 
After a disappointing  season with the BT55, the team reverted to a more conventional design in 1987.

The car was powered by the straight 4 turbocharged BMW engine and raced on Goodyear tyres. Brabham finished 8th in the 1987 Constructors' Championship with 10 points scored.

This was the last Brabham to use a turbocharged engine. It was also the last Brabham designed while longtime owner Bernie Ecclestone ran the team: he sold the team for US$5 million to Swiss businessman Walter Brun at the end of 1988 after buying it in 1972 for US$120,000 from the team's co-founder Ron Tauranac.

Racing history 
The BT56 was not a very competitive car; although it was quicker than some others (Patrese ran as high as second before retiring at the San Marino Grand Prix that year) it was nowhere near as competitive as the Williams, McLaren, Ferrari or Lotus cars that year.

It was also a very unreliable car; they had 7 finishes combined out of 16 races. Patrese had a third place in Mexico, although earlier in the season he had been unlucky to lose second place at the San Marino Grand Prix with alternator failure.

De Cesaris only finished one race, a third place at Belgium. Although he had a bad reputation for crashing, most of his retirements were due to mechanical failures. Some suspected that this was down to his questionable temperament and his harsh treatment of the car.

Brabham finished 8th in the 1987 Constructors' Championship with 10 points scored.

Complete Formula One results
(key)

References 

Brabham Formula One cars
1987 Formula One season cars